Amfikleia (before 1915: Δαδί - Dadi) is a town and a former municipality in Phthiotis, Greece. Since the 2011 local government reform it is part of the municipality Amfikleia-Elateia, of which it is a municipal unit.
The municipal unit has an area of 229.366 km2, the community 108.124 km2. At the 2011 census, the population of the municipal unit was 4,186 and of the community 3,191. The town is situated at the northern foot of Mount Parnassus, in the valley of the river Cephissus. It is 11 km northwest of Kato Tithorea and 31 km southeast of Lamia. Greek National Road 3 (Thebes - Lamia) passes through the town. The town is served by a railway station with connections on the Athens–Thessaloniki railway.

Subdivisions

The municipal unit Amfikleia consists of the following communities:
Amfikleia
Bralos
Drymaia
Palaiochori
Tithroni
Xylikoi

History
Amfikleia was named after the ancient town Amphicleia. Amphicleia was also named Amphicaea (Ἀμφίκαια) and Ophiteia (Ὀφιτεία). It was situated in the north of ancient Phocis. The Persians under Xerxes destroyed the city in 480 BC during the second Persian invasion of Greece. It was rebuilt afterwards, and at the time of Pausanias (2nd century AD), it was known for the worship of Dionysus.

During the Middle Ages, a tower was built on the site of the acropolis. Today the site is occupied by the cemetery.

Dadi, which was founded near the site of ancient Amphicleia, became a vibrant town; in early 19th century, William Leake reported 500 families living in the town. Dadi was renamed to Amfikleia in 1915.

Notable people 
 Athanasios Eftaxias (1849–1931), politician

Gallery

External links
 Municipality of Amfikleia-Elateia

References

Populated places in Phthiotis
Mount Parnassus